17th Street is the fifth studio album by heavy metal band Hammers of Misfortune. It was released in 2011 on Metal Blade Records.

Track listing

Personnel 
 John Cobbett: guitars
 Joe Hutton: lead vocals
 Leila Abdul-Rauf: guitars, vocals
 Sigrid Sheie: piano, keyboards, backing vocals
 Max Barnett: bass guitar
 Chewy Marzolo: drums, percussion

References 

 Album information from Blabbermouth.net

Hammers of Misfortune albums
2011 albums
Metal Blade Records albums